Edmundston was a provincial electoral district for the Legislative Assembly of New Brunswick, Canada.  It was superseded by the Edmundston-Saint Basile district in 2006.

Members of the Legislative Assembly

Election results

External links
Website of the Legislative Assembly of New Brunswick

Former provincial electoral districts of New Brunswick